CSS Jeff Davis may refer to the following ships of the Confederate States Navy:

 , a Confederate gunboat, captured by the Union forces.
 , a steamship, was reported in poor condition in October 1863.
 , two-masted schooner that was captured.
 , a steamboat that was surrendered at the end of the war.

See also 

 , confederate privateer brig.
 List of ships of the Confederate States Navy

Ships of the Confederate States Navy